Rahuapampa District is one of sixteen districts of the Huari Province in Peru.

References

Districts of the Huari Province
Districts of the Ancash Region